Terpineol is any of four isomeric monoterpenoids.  Terpenoids are terpene that are modified by the addition of a functional group, in this case, an alcohol.  Terpineols have been isolated from a variety of sources such as cardamom, cajuput oil, pine oil, and petitgrain oil. Four isomers exist: α-, β-, γ-terpineol, and terpinen-4-ol. β- and γ-terpineol differ only by the location of the double bond. Terpineol is usually a mixture of these isomers with α-terpineol as the major constituent.

Terpineol has a pleasant odor similar to lilac and is a common ingredient in perfumes, cosmetics, and flavors. α-Terpineol is one of the two most abundant aroma constituents of lapsang souchong tea; the α-terpineol originates in the pine smoke used to dry the tea. (+)-α-terpineol is a chemical constituent of skullcap.

Synthesis and biosynthesis
Although it is naturally occurring, terpineol is commonly manufactured from alpha-pinene, which is hydrated in the presence of sulfuric acid.

An alternative route starts from limonene:

Limonene reacts with trifluoroacetic acid in a Markovnikov addition to a trifluoroacetate intermediate, which is easily hydrolyzed with sodium hydroxide to α-terpineol with 7% selectivity. Side-products are β-terpineol in a mixture of the cis isomer, the trans isomer, and 4-terpineol.

The biosynthesis of α-terpineol proceeds from geranyl pyrophosphate, which releases pyrophosphate to give the terpinyl cation.  This carbocation is the precursor to many terpenes and terpenoids.  Its hydrolysis gives terpineol.

References

External links
 MSDS for alpha-terpineol
 

Flavors
Monoterpenes
Alkenols
Cyclohexenes